Donald R. Matthews may refer to:
 Donald Ray Matthews, U.S. Representative from Florida
 Donald Matthews (political scientist) (Donald Rowe Matthews), American political scientist